Desert Dove is the third studio album by American musician Michaela Anne. It was released on September 27, 2019 under Yep Roc Records.

Singles
The first single from the album "By Our Design" on June 13, 2019.

Critical reception
Desert Dove was met with "generally favorable" reviews from critics. At Metacritic, which assigns a weighted average rating out of 100 to reviews from mainstream publications, this release received an average score of 78, based on 4 reviews.

Accolades

Track listing

Personnel

 Michaela Anne – lead vocals
 Daniel Bailey – drums
 Steve Elliot – guitar
 Wyatt Jansfeld – bass
 Jeremy Long – guitar
 Daniel Rhine – bass
 Mark Stepro – drums
 Brian Whelan – guitar

 Kelly Winrich – engineer
 Alan Silverman – mastering
 Shani Ghandi – mixer

Charts

References

2019 albums
Yep Roc Records albums